The Sentier botanique de Soyaux (200 metres long) is an arboretum and botanical path located on the Chemin de la Mothe, rue du Bourg, Soyaux, Charente, Nouvelle-Aquitaine, France. It was created in 2000 along the remains of a rural road, and planted with 42 species of regional trees and shrubs (32 deciduous, 10 evergreen). The path is open daily without charge.

See also 
 List of botanical gardens in France

References 
 Sentier botanique de Soyaux
 Gralon.net description (French)
 Parcs et Jardins description (French)

Soyaux, Sentier botanique de
Soyaux, Sentier botanique de